Suvarna Mathew is an Indian actress in South Indian movies. She was a prominent lead actress during the 1990s in Malayalam and Kannada films. She had acted in few Tamil, Telugu and Hindi movies as well. She has acted with Vishnuvardhan in Kiladigalu, Jayaram in  Sudhinam and Suman in Nayudugari Kutumbam. She has done the Mithun Chakraborty films Do Numbri, Meri Adalat, Sultaan and Sanyasi Mera Naam.

She made a comeback with the Malayalam movie Chattakaari in 2012.

Personal life

Suvarna was born to Mathew and Elsamma, as the youngest among four children, at Pala, Kerala. She has two brothers; Saji, Sibi and a sister, Swapna. She won the Miss Kerala title in 1992, which paved her a way to the film industry. She rose to fame after the Malayalam movie Valayam. She married Varghese Jacob in 2003, and they have a son, Jacob and a daughter, Jia. She is settled in Philadelphia, United States with family.

Partial filmography

Malayalam

 Issacinte Kathakal ... Aleena
 Chattakaari (2012)... Margarette
 9 KK Road (2010) ... Mollykutty
 Aayudham (2008)... CI Vandana
 Lion (2006)... Krishnakumar's elder sister
 Nerariyan CBI (2005)... Maya
 The Tiger (2005)... Subaida Ahammed
 Kalavarkey (2003)... Alice
 Mazhathullikkilukkam (2002)... Treesa
 Malavika (2001)... Susanna
 Varavaay (2000)... Vijayan's second wife 
 The Gang (2000)... Merlyn
 Red Indians (2000)... Maya
 Kannaadikkadavathu (2000)... Ramani
 Indulekha (1999)
 Gaandhiyan (1999) ... Adv. Yamuna Rahim
 Sooryavanam (1998)... Maya
 Aaghosham (1998)... Nancy
 Saadaram (1995)... Lekha
 Sudhinam (1994)... Anila
 Sthalathe Pradhana Payyans (1993)
 Samooham (1993)... Thulasi
 Akashadoothu (1993)... Mini David
 Valayam (1992)... Radha
 Ennodu Ishtam Koodamo (1992)... Sudha Varma
 Congratulations Miss Anitha Menon (1992)... Seetha
 Maanyanmar (1992)... Thomas's sister
 Kauravar (1992) ... Aliyar's daughter
 Innathe Program (1991)... Unni's Neighbor 
 Kilukkampetti (1991)... Cameo in song
 Kilukkam (1991)... Pilla's relative
 Sundhari Kakka (1991) ... Cameo appearance
 Uncle Bun (1991) ... Student
Mimics Parade (1991)

Tamil

 Thaai Manasu (1994) ... Annalakshmi
 Kizhakku Malai (1995) ... Kanchana
 Mayabazar (1995)... Swarna
 Gokulathil Seethai (1996)... Kaveri (Guest appearance)
 Periya Thambi (1997)... Kannamma
 Ponmaanai Thedi (1998)... Priya
 Roja Kootam (2002)... Kiran 
 Shakalaka Baby (2002) ... Sooravalli
 Oru Thadava Sonna (2003)...
 Enakku 20 Unakku 18 (2003)... Preeti's sister-in-law
 Joot (2004) as Gayathri
 Varnajalam (2004)
 Chandramukhi (2005)... Swarna
 Oru Naal Oru Kanavu (2005)  ... Maya's sister
 Thirupathi (2006)
 Neeyum Naanum (2012)

Telugu
 Nayudugari Kutumbam (1996)... Hema
 High Class Atha Low Class Alludu (1997) ... Bhama
 Life Lo Wife (1998) ... Sachcha Devi
 Preminchalani Vundi (1999) ... Julie
 Nee Manasu Naaku Telusu (2003) ... Preeti's sister-in-law

Kannada
She appeared in more than 20 films in Kannada.
 Bandhu Balaga (2008) ...
 Jithendra (2001) ...
 Kanoonu (2001)... Kaveri
 Rashtrageethe (2001) ...
 Khalanayaka (1999)...
 Mr. X (1999) ... Asha
 Dayadi  (1998) ... Susheela
 Kanasalu Neene Manasalu Neene (1998)... Julie
 Mathina Malla (1998) ... Rani
 Choo Baana (1997) ... Poornima
 Ibbara Naduve Muddina Aata (1996)...
 Kiladigalu (1994)... Dr. Deepa

Hindi
 Do Numbri (1998)... Jamuna
 Sanyasi Mera Naam (1999)
 Sultaan (2000)... Ayesha

Serials
 Yagama Thiyagama - Micro Thodar Macro Sinthanaigal  - Tamil TV series
Gunagalum Ranagalum -Micro Thodar Macro Sinthanaigal - Tamil TV series
 Avicharitham (2004-2005) - Malayalam TV series
 Kadamattathu Kathanar (2004) - Malayalam TV series
 Anweshi - Malayalam TV series
Sreethwam - Malayalam TV series 
 Sathurangam (2005-2006)  - Tamil TV series
 January (2007) - Malayalam TV series
 Thenmozhiyal  (2007) - Tamil TV series
Maya Machindra - Tamil TV series
Akashadoothu - Malayalam TV series - {Archive footage}

References

External links

 Suvarna at MSI

Actresses in Malayalam cinema
Actresses from Kerala
Indian film actresses
Actresses in Kannada cinema
People from Pala, Kerala
Actresses in Malayalam television
Indian television actresses
Actresses in Hindi cinema
Actresses in Telugu cinema
Actresses in Tamil cinema
20th-century Indian actresses
21st-century Indian actresses
Actresses in Tamil television